The MMT Observatory (MMTO) is an astronomical observatory on the site of Fred Lawrence Whipple Observatory (IAU observatory code 696). The Whipple observatory complex is located on Mount Hopkins, Arizona, US (55 km south of Tucson) in the Santa Rita Mountains. The observatory is operated by the University of Arizona and the Smithsonian Institution, and has a visitor center in nearby Amado, Arizona.
The MMTO is the home of the MMT (formerly Multiple Mirror Telescope), which has a primary mirror 6.5 m in diameter. The name comes from the six smaller mirrors originally used before the single primary mirror was installed in 1998. The primary mirror has a special lightweight honeycomb design made by the University of Arizona's Steward Observatory Mirror Laboratory.
The MMT is housed in a building which allows the walls and roof around the telescope to be completely rolled back, allowing it to cool down very quickly in order to improve  observation.

Multiple Mirror Telescope (1979–1998) 

These mirrors were providing the equivalent gathering area of a 4.5-meter telescope, making it the third largest optical telescope in the world at the time of its dedication. It featured ambitious design innovations including its unusual optical design proposed by Aden Meinel, a co-rotating building and an altitude-azimuth mount.

With the exception of the Large Altazimuth Telescope and William Herschel's 40-foot telescope, major optical telescopes prior to the MMT used equatorial mounts. The MMT heralded a change in telescope design; all major optical telescopes since the MMT have been built with altitude-azimuth mounts. Several technologies pioneered at the MMT contributed to the success of the subsequent generation of large telescopes. These included: high dynamic-range servos for the altitude-azimuth mount; highly accurate pointing that eliminated the need for sky charts; co-alignment and co-phasing of multiple telescopes; improvements to optical performance by attention to the
thermal environment of the facility; contributions to vacuum coatings deposition, optics cleaning, and maintenance; and early experiments in co-phased adaptive optics.

MMT (1998–present) 

One of the reasons for its original multiple mirror design was the difficulty of casting large mirrors. One solution to this problem was found by Roger Angel of Steward Observatory, of the University of Arizona, who cast mirrors with a honeycomb structure in the interior of a rotating oven. This made it possible to replace the six mirrors with a single 6.5-meter one. The original building and part of the structure could be reused. The new mirror was the first of its size to be cast and polished in the Steward Observatory Mirror Laboratory. The updated MMT, its name no longer an acronym, was rededicated on 20 May 2000.

In late 2002, a novel deformable secondary mirror was added to the telescope. While other adaptive optics designs do their corrections with additional mirrors, minimizing the number of warm surfaces in the light path produces better results in infrared wavelengths. The MMT AO system contributed to the design of the Large Binocular Telescope, which achieved record breaking Strehl ratios with its AO system in 2010.

From 2004 to 2010, approximately 8% of MMT observing time was made accessible to the entire astronomical community via the US National Science Foundation's Telescope System Instrumentation Program (TSIP), administered by the National Optical Astronomy Observatory (NOAO).

See also 
 Massive Monolithic Telescope A telescope made from a single piece of glass
 List of astronomical observatories
 List of largest optical reflecting telescopes
 List largest optical telescopes in the continental United States

References

External links 

The MMT Observatory
MMT adaptive optics home page
Mount Hopkins Clear Sky Clock Forecast of observing conditions.
Smithsonian Astrophysical Observatory (SAO)
University of Arizona's Steward Observatory

University of Arizona
Astronomical observatories in Arizona
Buildings and structures in Santa Cruz County, Arizona
Fred Lawrence Whipple Observatory
1979 establishments in Arizona